A sensory garden is a self-contained garden area that allows visitors to enjoy a wide variety of sensory experiences. Sensory gardens are designed to provide opportunities to stimulate the senses, both individually and in combination, in ways that users may not usually encounter.

Sensory gardens have a wide range of educational and recreational applications. They can be used in the education of special-needs students, including autistic people. As a form of horticultural therapy, they may act as therapeutic gardens to help in the care of people with dementia.

Sensory gardens can be designed in such a way as to be accessible and enjoyable for both disabled and non-disabled users. A sensory garden, for example, may contain features accessible to the disabled individual such as: scented and edible plants, sculptures and sculpted handrails, water features designed to make sound and play over the hands, textured touch-pads, magnifying-glass screens, braille and audio induction loop descriptions. Depending on the user group, other provisions may integrate sound and music more centrally to combine the play needs of younger users with their sensory needs.

Many sensory gardens devote themselves to providing experience for multiple senses; those specialising in scent are sometimes called scented gardens, those specialising in music/sound are sound gardens where the equipment doubles up to provides an enhanced opportunity for strategic developmental, learning and educational outcomes.

Sensory gardens usually have an enhanced infrastructure to permit wheelchair access and meet other accessibility concerns; the design and layout provides a stimulating journey through the senses, heightening awareness, and bringing positive learning experiences.

Design 

Sensory garden design is generally based around the five Aristotelian senses, but it can also include other senses such as proprioception and balance. In addition to plants, non-living elements, such as water features and sculptures, may be incorporated.

Sight 

Sight components in a sensory garden include traditional garden elements like colorful plants and flowers, which are sometimes clustered together to assist people with vision impairments. These plants can also be used to attract birds and butterflies to the garden, which can add additional sight variety.

Hearing 

Sound components in a sensory garden are often things that make sounds naturally in a breeze. This includes plants like bamboo, grasses, trees, as well as non-living elements like bells and wind chimes. Water features and birds are also common sound components.

Less common sound components include things like hand instruments (such as drums), echo spaces, and chiming stepping stones.

Sensory dementia gardens 
Sensory gardens can be designed specifically for people with dementia, a condition that can affect different parts of the brain and many aspects of everyday life, including memory, in which everyday tasks such as walking or eating typically become difficult. Sensory or therapeutic gardens can be used to help reduce the symptoms of dementia without the use of drugs through stimulation of the senses, exercising various parts of the brain. Sensory gardens may elicit positive emotions in people living with dementia, and help improve their quality of life.

Design characteristics may include water features that produces soothing sounds, pick-and-sniff herb and flower beds, and benches with different types of sand or pebbles to sink their feet into. For example, in a sensory garden located in Port Macquarie, Australia, one person enjoys sinking his toes into the sand as it elicits memories of Australia for him, while the gravel reminds him of Scotland where he was born which he does not enjoy as much.  Other potential benefits include a calming and relaxing place providing an easy and safe way to exercise with feelings of independence.

Gallery

See also 
 List of sensory gardens
 List of garden types

References

Disability accommodations
Types of garden
Sculpture gardens, trails and parks